Habronattus clypeatus is a species of jumping spider which occurs in the United States and Mexico. Its range extends from the southern Rocky Mountains to the northern Sierra Madre Occidental and Sonoran Desert. It belongs to the viridipes species group within the genus Habronattus.

References

External links
Habronattus clypeatus at Salticidae: Diagnostic Drawings Library

Salticidae
Spiders of the United States
Spiders of Mexico
Spiders described in 1895
Taxa named by Nathan Banks